Christopher Repka (born 6 October 1998) is a Slovak chess grandmaster. He is a two-time Slovak Chess Champion.

Chess career

Born on 6 October 1998, Repka earned his international master (IM) title in 2016 and his grandmaster (GM) title in 2018, becoming the youngest GM in Slovak history. He won the Slovak Chess Championship in 2017. He is the No. 2 ranked Slovak player as of May 2018. He won the Slovak Championship again in 2018.

Personal life
Repka is the son of the Slovak IM Eva Repková and Lebanese IM Fadi Eid.

References

External links

1998 births
Living people
Chess grandmasters
Chess Olympiad competitors
Slovak chess players
Slovak people of Lebanese descent
Sportspeople of Lebanese descent